Johannes Matigonda (born 11 June 1984) is a Zimbabwean cricketer. He made his first-class debut for Centrals cricket team in the 2006–07 Logan Cup on 26 April 2007.

References

External links
 

1984 births
Living people
Zimbabwean cricketers
Centrals cricketers
Sportspeople from Harare